Ajit Singh Saini (1922–2007) was an eminent and critically acclaimed  writer  of Punjab (India). He was associated with the Punjabi daily "Ajit" as its managing editor  and columnist. He is remembered in Punjab both as a freedom-fighter and an acclaimed writer and columnist. He was an officer in Indian National Army (INA) and  a close  lieutenant of Subhas Chandra Bose. Saini worked with the wire service of INA and Arzi Hukumat-e-Azad Hind or  Provisional Government of Free India, more simply, Indian government in exile.

Indian National Army (INA) officer

Ajit Saini joined the British Indian Army where he was a lieutenant military officer. While fighting the Japanese army in the Malayan campaign, he came under the influence of Capt. Mohan Singh and thereafter defected to the Indian National Army in order to fight for India's liberation.  His first job as part of INA was as the army's liaison officer for handling INA's communication with Japanese forces and diplomats. Thereafter he also worked as the assistant editor of INA news magazine Azad Hind which was published from Singapore.

Career as a journalist and writer

In 1956 Ajit Saini joined Information and Broadcasting Department of Government of India and launched his dedicated writing career.  He was also the managing editor of the Punjabi daily 'Ajit' which is one of Punjab's reputed newspaper.

Awards and recognition

Ajit Saini was felicitated during his lifetime both for his contributions to India's freedom movement and to the literary arena. During his lifetime he won the following awards and recognitions:
Commendation from the Chief Minister of Punjab, Giani Zail Singh, later India's President,  for contribution to freedom movement.
Commendation from Sahit Vichar Kendar for literary contributions.
Commendation from the Punjab Teachers Union for journalistic excellence.

His short-story anthology titled, 'Wadhiya Tea-set', was released in a literary conference held in New Delhi by the late ex-Prime Minister Narasimha Rao who was then India's Foreign Minister.

Critically acclaimed literary works

Some of Ajit Saini's notable anthologies of short stories in Punjabi language which won critical acclaim are as follows:
Jai Hind
Wadhiya Tea-set
Tutade Rishte
Mitti Di Pukar
Aurat Faltu Nahin
Adhura Shahkar
Ek Manas ki Jaat

Death widely condoled: Chief Minister's message

Ajit Saini, died 10 December 2007 and his demise was widely condoled in Punjab. In a condolence message the Chief Minister said that 'Saini was a multi-faceted personality who served in the Indian National Army (INA) and made a significant contribution towards the Indian freedom struggle. As a noted Journalist and an eminent Columnist Ajit Saini through his prolific writings in the esteemed columns of  regional and national newspapers proved to be instrumental in bringing social awakening amongst the down-trodden and unprivileged section of the society. In his death "a void has been created in the literary circles which was difficult to be filled"', said  Badal.

References

1922 births
2007 deaths
Punjabi-language writers
Journalists from Punjab, India
Punjabi people
Indian columnists
Indian editors
20th-century Indian journalists
British Indian Army personnel